Guam Highway 9 (GH-9) is one of the primary automobile highways in the United States territory of Guam.

Route description
This northern route is a relatively short connector between GH-3 (and its spur route GH-3A) and GH-1, skirting the southern reaches of Andersen Air Force Base. At the western terminus, traffic defaults onto GH-3 heading south back towards Dededo through the Finegayan area while at the eastern terminus, at the main entrance to Andersen AFB, traffic defaults onto GH-1 heading south back into Yigo proper.

Major intersections

References

009